Nototriton stuarti is a species of salamander in the family Plethodontidae. Being only known from its type locality in the Izabal Department, it is endemic to Guatemala.

The single known individual was collected inside a log in a very wet forest.

References

Nototriton
Endemic fauna of Guatemala
Amphibians of Guatemala
Taxonomy articles created by Polbot
Amphibians described in 2000